Seoige is an Irish television chat show. The show, hosted by sisters Gráinne and Síle Seoige, was broadcast live on weekdays at 16:30 on RTÉ One, with a hiatus in the summer months. Episodes were repeated at 08:20 the following weekday morning on the same channel.

The programme was originally launched in 2006 as Seoige and O'Shea with Gráinne Seoige and Joe O'Shea at the helm. It followed a similar format to ITV's This Morning programme. Moving between serious issues and lighter subjects, content included interviews, debates and musical performances. Viewers could call, text or e-mail the programme's studio to give their opinions on topics. The presenters chatted with four sets of guests, which consisted of interviewees, discussion groups and musical artists.

The show was rebranded Seoige in August 2008 after Joe O'Shea announced he was leaving RTÉ to pursue a career in radio broadcasting.
RTÉ announced on 21 April 2009 that the show would be cancelled and that the last show would air on Friday 24 April 2009. A new series was not commissioned for the autumn of 2009.

Episodes

First series
The first series began on 9 October 2006 and ran until 20 April 2007. In the first series, Seoige and O'Shea ran a short story and photograph competition. The top 14 writers were published in a book entitled Do The Write Thing.

The winner, Ellen McCarthy, from Waterford was signed by publishers Poolbeg and her debut novel, Guarding Maggie was released on 2 May 2008. Following superb reaction to Guarding Maggie, Ellen's second novel, Guilt Ridden was released in January 2009.

Second series
The second series began on 1 October 2007 and ran until 18 April 2008. In the second series, the programme took on a new look and added a live studio audience. As part of the new-look series, there were also a number of new features. Relative Values looked at the family life of some of the nation's stars, Home Values showed exclusive peeks into the homes of some of Ireland's celebrities, and Money Matters offered solutions to money worries. There was also a regular travel slot and a weekly feature concerning psychics. There was a daily feature – Talking Point – where social issues were discussed. Following on from the success of the Do The Write Thing competition, Seoige and O'Shea began to host their own book club. On Wednesday, a well-known personality introduced his/her favourite book and was joined by a book club to review the week's chosen books. On Friday, there were musical performances and a preview spot where a panel of previewers inform viewers about the entertainment, music and sport events taking place around the country at the weekend.

Third series
The third series began in October 2008 and saw Sile Seoige replace Joe O'Shea as co-presenter.

All will be on RTE Player to celebrate 60 Years Of Television Christmas 2021.

Guests
Guests on the first two series' of the show include:
David Norris, senator
Cecelia Ahern, author
Louis Walsh, music manager
Mickey Joe Harte, singer
Bosco, children's television presenter
Gordon Ramsay, chef
John Waters, journalist
Mary O'Rourke, TD
Mary Harney, TD
Moya Brennan, singer
Eddie Hobbs, financial advisor
Katy French, model
The Wolfe Tones, Irish band
Keith Duffy, television personality
Joe Duffy, radio personality
Brian Ormond, presenter
Aidan Power, presenter
David Mitchell, actor
Gerry Ryan, radio personality
Ryan Tubridy, presenter
Derek Davis, television personality
Pat Shortt, comedian
Éamon Dunphy, broadcaster
Mary McEvoy, actress
Patrick Clarke, writer producer (Anton)
Eric Mabius, actor (Ugly Betty)
Victoria Smurfit, actress

Reception
Although Seoige and O'Shea claimed that the programme had proven successful, television ratings show that it has failed to enter the top 20. It launched with 100,000 viewers on 9 October 2006.  In April 2008, it pulled in an average viewership of 20–21 percent of the available audience. October 2008 attracted average viewing figures of 112,000 for each episode. In January 2009, the show pulled in an average viewership of 127,000. Critics believed that the show's time slot and topics are responsible for its low viewing figures.

Criticism
The show's format had been criticised in editorials in both the Irish Independent and The Sunday Times.

John Meagher asserted that Seoige and O'Shea had no chemistry between them: "Where was the on-screen chemistry, the "telly marriage" that both had talked up so much in the days leading up to the start date?"

Seoige and O'Shea were perceived by John Boland as being unsuited to the field of chat shows, his description of their presentation styles stating: "As they [Seoige and O'Shea] lurched awkwardly from trivial items to serious topics they were nervous and stilted – she as much as he – and nowhere did they convey the ease that would put the make viewer feel at home."

Pat Stacey of the Evening Herald had asserted that Sile and Grainne had no chemistry between them.

Jade Goody's agent Max Clifford had criticised Sile and Grainne for their "aggressive" interview concerning Jade.

References

External links
 RTÉ.ie page

 Review of Seoige and O'Shea

2006 Irish television series debuts
2009 Irish television series endings
Irish television talk shows
RTÉ original programming